Alberto Rodríguez Librero (born 11 May 1971) is a Spanish film director and screenwriter.

Selected filmography

Bibliography
El cine de Alberto Rodríguez. Conversaciones, de Manuel Lamarca, Ediciones Carena, Barcelona, 2020, .

References

External links
 

1971 births
Living people
People from Seville
Spanish film directors
Spanish male screenwriters
Spanish male writers
Best Director Goya Award winners
21st-century Spanish screenwriters